Morgantown is the name of several places in the United States of America:

Places
 Morgantown, Indiana, a town
 Morgantown, Kentucky, a city
 Morgantown, Maryland, an unincorporated community
 Morgantown, Adams County, Mississippi, a census-designated place
 Morgantown, Marion County, Mississippi, an unincorporated community
 Morgantown, Oktibbeha County, Mississippi, an unincorporated community
 Morgantown, Burlington, North Carolina, a neighborhood
 Morgantown, Ohio, an unincorporated community
 Morgantown, Pennsylvania, a census-designated place
 Morgantown, West Virginia, a city; the largest Morgantown

Roads
Morgantown Expressway

See also 
 Uniontown (disambiguation)